Heloplax is a genus of worm-like molluscs. Its soft parts are preserved in three dimensions in the Silurian Herefordshire Lagerstatte; its disarticulated valves are known from other Silurian deposits.
It is very bizarre by modern standards; it bears serially repeated units, and has spines.  It probably falls somewhere between the aplacophorans and polyplacophora; its valves were composed of aragonite

References 

Prehistoric chiton genera
Wenlock series fossils